The Xuancheng High School of Anhui Province, commonly referred to as Xuancheng High School or Xuanzhong, is a public high school located in Xuancheng, Anhui Province, China. It was established in 1906 as Secondary School of Ningguo Prefecture.

History

Timeline
 1906 Secondary School of Ningguo Prefecture 
 1913 Anhui Fourth Provincial Normal School 
 1927 Anhui Fourth Provincial High School
 1945 Anhui Provincial Xuancheng High School
 1949 Xuancheng High School of Southern Anhui (Wannan)
 1952 Xuancheng High School of Anhui Province

Alumni
 Ding Xueliang: Professor at the Hong Kong University of Science and Technology. 
 Zhang Bojun: Chinese politician and intellectual.
 Ren Xinmin: Chinese Engineer, Chief Designer of Chinese storable propellant rocket engines.

External links
 Official website of Xuancheng High School

Educational institutions established in 1906
High schools in Anhui
1906 establishments in China